Alan Thaw (17 January 1926 – 22 February 2007) was an Australian rules footballer who played for Essendon in the Victorian Football League.

Recruited locally, Thaw was a back pocket in Essendon's 1949 premiership side. He retired in 1954 and the following season was put in charge of the Reserves team, coaching them until 1959. In the 1959 VFL season he coached Essendon to a win over Fitzroy when Dick Reynolds was unavailable. From 1960 to 1976, Thaw was coach of Essendon's Under-19s and steered them to premierships in 1961 and 1966.

References

Holmesby, Russell and Main, Jim (2007). The Encyclopedia of AFL Footballers. 7th ed. Melbourne: Bas Publishing.

1926 births
2007 deaths
Australian rules footballers from Victoria (Australia)
Essendon Football Club players
Essendon Football Club Premiership players
Essendon Football Club coaches
One-time VFL/AFL Premiership players